Tim J. Sinclair (born 1977 or 1978) is an American television and radio broadcaster, and public address announcer. He currently works as the announcer for home games of the Chicago Bears in the National Football League (NFL) since 2020, Chicago Bulls in the National Basketball Association (NBA) since 2020–21, Chicago Fire FC in Major League Soccer (MLS) since 2014 and the Illinois Fighting Illini men's basketball team in the National Collegiate Athletic Association (NCAA) since 2015–16. He previously worked as the announcer for the Indiana Pacers NBA franchise for two seasons from 2018–19 to 2019–20, leaving to join the Bulls ahead of the 2020–21 season, where he replaced long-serving announcer Tommy Edwards. He began with the Bears in 2020, taking over from 37-year veteran announcer Jim Riebandt. He was also previously the announcer for the Fighting Illini women's basketball team, finishing in 2021–22 after 10 seasons.

Sinclair served as the public address announcer for the NBA All-Star Game in Chicago in 2020 and in Cleveland for the league's 75th season in 2022. He was also one of four public address announcers for the 2020 NBA Bubble at Walt Disney World in Florida for a five-week spell, followed by four weeks in the Wubble at IMG Academy in Bradenton, Florida, before leaving to commence his announcing duties for the Chicago Bears at Soldier Field. In 2021, he was included in the video game NBA 2K22 as the in-game announcer for Bulls home games.

References

External links
Official site

American television hosts
American radio DJs
Living people

1970s births
Year of birth uncertain